Liudvikas Strolis  (1905–1996) is a Lithuanian ceramist.

See also
List of Lithuanian artists

References
This article was initially translated from the Lithuanian Wikipedia.

1905 births
1996 deaths
20th-century Lithuanian artists
Soviet artists